Callisto is a fictional character appearing in American comic books published by Marvel Comics and is associated with the X-Men. She is the leader of New York City's subterranean mutant settlement the Morlocks, until losing that post in a duel against Storm. Storm subsequently leaves the group in Callisto's care as her representative, and the two eventually form an uneasy alliance.

Callisto appeared in the 2006 film, X-Men: The Last Stand, played by Dania Ramirez.

Publication history

Created by writer Chris Claremont and artist Paul Smith, she first appeared in The Uncanny X-Men #169 (May 1983).

Fictional character biography
Callisto's origins are unknown, although she claims that the scars she bears are proof of "how dumb a mistake" it was for her to try to live among normal humans; in one of her earlier appearances, her greatest psychological fear is the image of the beautiful woman that she once was.

Morlocks
Callisto takes up residence in an abandoned Cold War-era bomb shelter hidden within the sewers. Under untold circumstances, she meets Caliban, a mutant whose power is to sense the presence of other mutants. She decides to make the bomb shelter a sanctuary for mutants like herself, using Caliban's power to track down such mutants. She calls this newly formed society the Morlocks, after the group of futuristic subterraneans known as Morlocks in The Time Machine by H.G. Wells. Callisto kidnaps Angel, intending to make him her mate. Kitty Pryde is struck with a deadly illness in an attempt to rescue him, and Callisto refuses to allow her companions to take her to the surface for medical treatment. To rescue Kitty, Storm challenges and beats Callisto in a duel for the leadership of the Morlocks. As the new leader of the Morlocks, Storm decrees that they would no longer kidnap and terrorize surface-dwellers, and in return they would have peace. The confrontation between Callisto and Storm leaves both parties consumed with hatred for each other.

Callisto attempts to take revenge on Storm by manipulating Kitty Pryde into marrying Caliban, but is foiled when Caliban releases Kitty from their betrothal. When the wizard Kulan Gath enslaves and ensorcells the city of New York and transforms it into a Hyborian Age city, Callisto becomes his warrior servant. She battles Storm again, but Storm saves her life. Callisto helps defeat Kulan Gath, and as a result Callisto and her allies find themselves on a new timeline where Kulan Gath never transformed New York.

Thereafter, Callisto becomes more of an ally to the X-Men. She rescues Professor X after he was nearly killed by an anti-mutant mob. She saves Power Pack from the Morlocks Annalee and Masque. Callisto is wounded during the Marauders' massacre of the Morlocks, and takes refuge with the X-Men. She convinces Storm not to give up leadership of the X-Men.

After a while, Callisto moves to Muir Island to become the bodyguard for Moira MacTaggert. With Moira, she is transported to an alternate Earth where Britain is dominated by Nazis. Meanwhile, the Nazi counterparts of Callisto and Moira appear on the mainstream Earth. These counterparts capture Brigadier Alistaire Stuart at the Tower of London, but fail in their attempt to escape the Tower of London. Both Callisto and Moira and their counterparts then return to their native Earths.

Being beautiful
Callisto later encounters an amnesiac Colossus, who has assumed the identity of artist Peter Nicholas. Peter remembers nothing of his former life after his journey through the Siege Perilous. The two become attracted to each other after Masque, who had taken control of the Morlocks in Callisto's absence, restores Callisto's beauty to greater than it was, only to take it away later as a means of tormenting her. The process is repeated several times before Callisto and Colossus are rescued by Forge, Banshee, and Jean Grey.

Callisto began a career as a fashion model and moved above ground, embarking on a new life with Peter Nicholas as her lover. They were attacked by Genoshan magistrates but defeated them. The Morlocks later attacked Callisto, still under the influence of Masque. Masque had grossly transformed the Morlocks, leaving them with grotesque physical mutations. They nearly beat Callisto to death. The Morlocks' Healer treated her wounds, but accidentally restored Callisto's scars and her original physical deformities. The Healer's powers were overloaded by the severity of her injuries, killing him in the process.

Callisto vowed revenge on her former followers for stealing away her looks, and then allied herself with Mikhail Rasputin, Colossus' older brother. Mikhail and Callisto appeared to have perished when he used his powers over matter to flood the Morlock tunnels. Rasputin had actually transported the Morlocks into an alternate reality, where time moved more quickly than on Earth. There she watched as the Morlock youths grew up with great bitterness towards their elders for all that had happened to them.

When the young Morlocks, now calling themselves Gene Nation, returned to Earth with revenge planned, she went looking for help and located her former love Colossus, who had recently returned to Earth after the fall of Avalon. The two returned to the X-Mansion to warn the X-Men that Gene Nation was planning to kill innocents for every Morlock killed during the Mutant Massacre. Drawing Storm and Wolverine into the tunnels, she witnessed as Storm fought Marrow in a duel that saw the X-Man once more resort to lethal measures to win.

Callisto remained in the tunnels looking over Marrow until she became injured during the events of Operation: Zero Tolerance. Recovering from her wounds, she told Marrow to find a place amongst the X-Men, figuring it to be the best place for her. Callisto also has a maternal relationship with Marrow, acting as a mother-figure towards the young mutant, though the two are not biologically related, making her the only person Marrow would follow nearly blindly. After the six-month gap and Marrow's departure from the X-Men, Callisto disappeared.

Later, Callisto was once again transformed by Masque, having her arms reformed into tentacles. Callisto was also under Masque's control in "The Arena," an elite fight club in Japan. Callisto and Storm battled each other in the Arena, but later both escaped with help from Storm's friend, Yukio.

Genoshan Excalibur
She was one of the main characters in the 2004 Excalibur title, where she was helping Professor Xavier and Magneto rebuild Genosha. This alliance briefly reunited her with Archangel.

Son of M
In the aftermath of House of M, Callisto is among the many mutants to have lost her powers. Quicksilver offered to her the Terrigen Mists, stolen from the Inhumans, as a way to restore her powers. Callisto willingly accepted the offer and the Mist effectively restored all her previous abilities (minus her disfigurements and arm-tentacles), but without any control over them. Her new senses are so acute that even a drop of rain causes her tremendous pain; unable to handle it, she fell into a coma. The depowered Magneto found her body and showed it to Quicksilver saying that he poisoned her with the Terrigen Mist. He later took her body to a hospital, where the effects of the Mists wore off.

X-Cell
Callisto was later reunited with Marrow as members of X-Cell, a group of mutants who hold the government responsible for their power loss. When Quicksilver offered to repower its members, she warned Marrow about what happens to non-Inhumans who gain power from the Terrigen Mist. She and Marrow later fled into the sewers to escape the government.

Return to the sewers
At some point, Callisto returned to the sewers, this time alone. However, she is later discovered by various teen and young adult runaways, who she begins to care for, though with a firm but caring hand. Storm later stumbles upon this group while investigating one of the young girl's disappearance. Storm and Callisto let old feelings surface and the two fight. However, when Storm sees the girl helping Callisto, she realizes that the girl is there by choice and the hostilities cease. Storm helps them clean up. Before leaving, Storm offers Callisto to send regular help should they need it.

At the time when the Terrigen Cloud was loose on Earth infecting mutants with M-Pox since the Infinity storyline, the number of mutants that are living underground had increased as Callisto also showed sympathy towards the humans who sought out refuge from the global landscape. As a way to live out the dream of Professor X, this unified society of humans and mutants lived together as the New Morlocks.

But her little community soon came under assault when morlocks infected by a type of psi-vampirism attacked them while Monet and a morally inverted Creed stayed down in their territory to suss out the source of a new mutant sickness. As it happens the perpetrator of the underlife abductions was none other than M's brother Emplate, whom was suffering as much from the M-Pox epidemic as everyone else since it was killing off his only food supply. Callisto and Sabretooth attempted to fight him off and free the captured morlocks but were quickly incapacitated by the mutant leech.

X-Men: Gold
Callisto would soon find herself incarcerated at a new superpowered prison for homo superior, despite not being a mutant anymore due to Decimation. She would become an inmate at the 'Robert Kelly Correctional Facility'; also known as The Box, whilst playing gopher to the other inmates. At first attempting to become top dog while jailed at the mutant's only penitentiary, she was soon reminded of her place when a burlier convict had lain her out for thirty days. Now she sends a warning towards new inmates Kitty, Storm and Rachel Grey-Summers that said jailbird who runs the block is zeroing in on the X-Men in order to solidify her status as #1.

As it turns out, it was all staged by the depowered outlaw; the win-win situation being that she could establish herself as the new alpha if a trio of hated enemies succeeded and would still garner personal satisfaction at their defeat in the case that they failed.

Sometime after their release and news of Kathrine Pryde's marriage to Piotr Rasputin is outed to the public, Callisto escapes prison to confront Kitty while she's out on a bachelorette party to celebrate. The two fight for a bit with Kitty mistaking her intentions as another attempted kidnapping but Callisto's intentions were in fact plain. A simple threat to the lucky lady should she do anything to hurt Colossus during their wedding nuptials. Recounting the time when she and Piotr were an item, the morlock leader warns Kathrine to treat him right lest Callisto do her in before disappearing back into solitude.

Disassembled
After the calamitous events which befell the X-Men and left the mutant populous in dire straits as the Morlocks in her care are once more facing genocide due to the tumult caused by their departure. Even after Chamber came down to care for them, Callisto's people still faced more bloodshed than ever due to the chaos caused by the Office of National Emergency which was blamed on the resurgent Marauders. Going so far as to incapacitate Wolverine just so he would not rob her of the kill for their crimes when the X-Men came searching for clues as to a couple of items to scratch off their to do list.

Dawn of X
With the grand announcement of the new mutant nation of Krakoa broadcast to the world. Callisto, despite no longer being a mutant, was one among many whom accepted sanctuary there alongside a host of other criminal mutant malcontents. She was also presided over the dead Xavier after he was fatally shot by one amongst a crew of Reaver like homunculi who somehow infiltrated Krakoa's defenses.

A couple days before the nation leaders death & resurrection, Callisto was called to the personal island quarters of Ms. Frost to discuss a mutual partnership with the queen of the underground. The White Queen petitioning her to be Emma's white knight in the Hellfire Trading Company both to foster trust amongst the mutant and human communities due to her own overly persuasive nature, and the fact that high seas transport can be incredibly dangerous and her branch of the industry needs enforcers to manage the national interests of Krakoa.

Although a bit irked at Emma Frost for ignoring her for most of her life, Callisto decides on a temp occupation of the position until deciding on whether or not she feels comfortable with the gig. While still somewhat untrusting of the White Queen, Callisto admits to her treacherous lieutenant Masque that she's interested in what she's selling nonetheless.

After half a year working as Emma's paladin, she would meet up with members of the Red Queen's; Catherine Pryde's, crew on the Marauders at Island M to take and catalog their contraband while exchanging some swift and deadly albeit friendly parley with her old rival Ororo Munroe after they dock. While questioning why it was Lucas Bishop took so long to return to port, the latter wonders about the whereabouts of his leader and friend. To which the White Knight responds that she never returned from her voyage after what happened in Madripoor. Callisto would later undergo the Crucible and die at the hands of Storm. As a result, she was revived by Krakoa's resurrection protocols with her powers returned.

Powers and abilities
As a mutant, Callisto possesses enhanced senses of sight (including night vision), hearing, smell, taste, and touch coupled with possibly moderate degrees of enhanced conditioning; such as superhuman strength, speed, agility, etc. It has also been suggested that her mutant power grants her tactical brilliance that allows her to see the best way to engage in any given conflict.

Callisto was subjected to biophysical alteration by Masque on numerous occasions, once having multi tendril appendages in place of her arms for a short time, but lost these modifications along with her mutant powers after House of M. Her abilities were temporarily restored through use of the Terrigen Mists, although her senses were enhanced to a point where normal sensations became painful.

Callisto also has excellent hand-to-hand combat skills, is an exceptional hunter and tracker and excels at stealth infantry when necessary. She is usually armed with knives and is adept in their use, having unerring accuracy while in hand as throwing weapons. She is also an adroit leader who can come up with incredibly tactile plans and schemes even without her superhuman tactical perception.

Other versions

Age of Apocalypse
In the Age of Apocalypse reality, Callisto is neither a follower of Apocalypse nor an enemy of his regime. She's the leader of a band of pirates that attack the few vessels that venture through the Infernal Gallop to Avalon. She captures the submarine Excalibur and kills all of its passengers except for Nightcrawler and ends up being killed by Mystique.

Cross Time Capers
Another version of Callisto is seen when Excalibur confronts inadvertent visitors of a world dominated by Nazis. She is the bodyguard of Moira MacTaggert. These Nazis unintentionally send Excalibur on a long adventure known as the Cross-Time Caper.

House of M
In the House of M reality, Callisto is the leader of the Marauders, a black ops team.

Mutant X
In the Mutant X universe, she still leads the Morlocks, but is much more weak-willed and pacifist in nature. She is the lover of Mole Man.

Ultimate Marvel
The Ultimate Marvel version of Callisto is introduced in Ultimate X-Men #82 as a member of the Morlocks. Her look has remained virtually unchanged, and she has the mutant ability to sprout a mass of tentacles from her eye which is covered by an eye-patch. It is also apparent that she has no control over herself when the tentacles come out as Caliban had to knock her out to keep her from killing Jean Grey during a fight with the X-Men.

X-Men Evolution
In the comic based on the show Callisto appears as the leader of the Morlocks.

In other media

Television
 Callisto appears in X-Men, voiced by Susan Roman.
 Callisto appears in X-Men: Evolution, voiced by Saffron Henderson. This version is the even-tempered leader of the Morlocks.

Film
Callisto appears in X-Men: The Last Stand, portrayed by Dania Ramirez. This version is a mutant speedster, expert hand-to-hand combatant, and leader of the Omegas who can sense other mutants' powers and locations. After joining forces with Magneto's Brotherhood to oppose the creation of a "mutant cure", she develops a rivalry with Storm, who eventually kills Callisto.

Miscellaneous
Callisto appears in the novelization of X-Men: The Last Stand, where she is the leader of the Marauders, an all-mutant gang, before joining Magneto's Brotherhood of Mutants. According to a novelty card game, she is said to have been born in the Dominican Republic and emigrated to Washington Heights as an infant, where she honed her skills as a fighter and tracker. Additionally, she does not possess super-speed and is spared by Storm.

References

External links
 MDP: Callisto - Marvel Database Project
 Callisto's origin on the Marvel Directory
 Callisto at the Marvel Universe Character Bio Wiki
 UncannyXmen.net Spotlight on Callisto

Characters created by Chris Claremont
Comics characters introduced in 1983
Fictional blade and dart throwers
Fictional bodyguards
Fictional characters with superhuman senses
Fictional knife-fighters
Fictional models
Fictional murderers
Marvel Comics characters who can move at superhuman speeds
Marvel Comics characters with superhuman strength
Marvel Comics female superheroes
Marvel Comics female supervillains
Marvel Comics film characters
Marvel Comics martial artists
Marvel Comics mutants
X-Men supporting characters